Beach handball is a team sport where two teams pass and bounce or roll a ball, trying to throw it in the goal of the opposing team. The game is similar to standard handball, but it is played on sand instead of on a solid floor. Because the ball loses most of its bounce on sand, there is little to no dribbling, and players instead perform more passing as the rules of travelling still apply.

Description
Matches are played as best two-out-of-three sets. If teams are tied at the end of a regular set then the teams play for a golden goal. If the teams are tied at the end of 2 sets then the teams will participate in a tie breaker. The tie break involves a goalie throwing the ball to their own player while that player attempts to score one-on-one with the opposing goalie. During regular play, if the goalkeeper scores a goal this counts as two points, compared to a normal goal scored by an outfield player which counts as 1 point. Creative or spectacular goals, such as 360 degree jumps and alley-oops, are awarded with two points, as well as in-flights and 6 meter throws.

The first European Championships was played in the year 2000.

, Brazil is ranked the number 1 country in the world, and is the winner of the world championship in both men's and women's divisions at the 2014 Beach Handball World Championships.

Attire 
In 2021, the Norwegian women's team were fined €1500 for being improperly dressed after the women wore bike-shorts instead of bikini bottoms at a European championship match in Bulgaria. Critics derided the fine and the underlying rule. Although the Norwegian Handball Federation announced they would pay the fines, pop singer Pink offered to pay for them. In November 2021, the International Handball Federation changed their dress rules to closely match the shorts that the Norwegian team were fined for wearing.

Competitions 
Beach Handball World Championships
Beach handball at the World Games
Beach handball at the World Beach Games 
IHF Youth Beach Handball World Championship
Regional
Asian Beach Handball Championship
European Beach Handball Championship (disambiguation)
Oceania Beach Handball Championship
Pan American Beach Handball Championship

See also
Beach volleyball
Handball

References

External links 
Suances Cup Beach Handball Championships
Polish Beach Handball Community
World CUP Cadiz 2008
Calella International Beach Handball Open
2011 European Beach Handball Championships,Umag, Croatia
Croatia 2011 European Men's and Women's Beach Handball Champions
Croatian Beach Handball

 
Handball variants
Ball games
Team sports
handball
Sports originating in Australia